Cullen James Hoback (born July 15, 1981) is an American film producer and director. He is also an occasional columnist and speaker. His documentary films include Monster Camp (2007), Terms and Conditions May Apply (2013), and What Lies Upstream (2018), as well as the HBO mini-series Q: Into the Storm (2021). His documentary style has been described as non-fiction horror with a comedic tone. He appears on-camera as a central character in Terms and Conditions May Apply and What Lies Upstream.

Following the release of Terms and Conditions May Apply, Hoback has written op-eds for many journals including The Guardian, presented to the American Bar Association Section of Antitrust Law, and has appeared as a privacy expert on networks and shows including MSNBC, CNN, NPR, Huffington Post, Stossel, and The Young Turks.

Career
Hoback directed his first notable film, Monster Camp, in 2007. The film considers various aspects of escapism involved in live-action role playing. The film premiered at the Cinequest Film Festival in 2007 and won the Audience Award for the best documentary. The film also screened at the Seattle International Film Festival and more than 50 other festivals, ultimately receiving a limited theatrical release.

Hoback's 2010 film FrICTION is nominally fiction, featuring actors playing characters based on themselves – including a married couple, a teenage student at their arts camp, and Hoback himself – but contains documentary elements, as the production of the scripted film affects the relationships of the actors.

In 2013, Hoback released the documentary film Terms and Conditions May Apply, which premiered at the Slamdance Film Festival before going onto various film festivals including Seattle International, Hot Docs and Festival Do Rio. He received a jury prize for best documentary feature at both the Newport Beach Film Festival and Sonoma International Film Festival. The film received a largely positive critical reception, with a cumulative score of 84% on Rotten Tomatoes. Hoback co-hosted a Q&A about the film on Reddit, with Edward Snowden’s legal counsel at the time, Ben Wizner. Hoback also held a screening in Washington DC for a number of high-powered officials and policy-makers, hosted by Congressman Justin Amash. Afterwards, Hoback moderated a discussion with whistleblowers Thomas Drake, Russell Tice, and whistleblower attorney Jesselyn Radack. In partnership with Demand Progress, 20,000 signatures were collected and delivered to lawmakers demanding they get educated on digital privacy.

In 2018, Hoback theatrically released What Lies Upstream, a feature documentary focused on scientific regulatory agencies, and the government oversight of drinking water safety. The film questions whether the Flint Water Crisis and the Elk River Chemical Spill, are outliers or signifiers of a nationwide scandal. What Lies Upstream was the opening night film at the 2017 Slamdance Film Festival, screened at AFI Docs, and received a Special Jury Prize for Investigative Filmmaking at The Seattle International Film Festival. The film was picked up by PBS' Independent Lens and has been met with a positive critical reception.

Hoback directed and produced a docuseries about the QAnon conspiracy theory, titled Q: Into the Storm. It premiered on HBO in March 2021.

Views 
Hoback has been critical of the relationship between corporations and the government, arguing that they've been complicit in creating a surveillance system. On December 25, 2013, Cullen Hoback and Ondi Timoner released a lengthy conversation about how the surveillance situation has evolved since her film, We Live in Public. In an interview with The Guardian earlier that month in December 2013, Hoback commented that whistleblower Edward Snowden should be granted immunity by the US government. Hoback has written several op-eds for The Guardian, one of which focused on how people need to reclaim control of their digital identities. In October 2014, Hoback was a featured speaker at the annual TED event in Jacksonville, titled We Don't Have a Privacy Problem.

Filmography

External links

References

1981 births
Living people
American documentary filmmakers
Whitman College alumni
People from Los Angeles